Bishamondai Station is a HRT station on Astram Line, located in 1-7-45, Bishamondai, Asaminami-ku, Hiroshima.

Platforms

Connections
█ Astram Line
●Ōmachi — ●Bishamondai — ●Yasuhigashi

Around station
Hiroshima City Asa Junior High School
Hiroshima Municipal Yasuhigashi Elementary School
Bishamondai Post office
Hiroshima Prefectural Yasufuruichi Senior High School
Hiroshima Municipal Bishamondai Elementary School
Bishamondai Park
Bishamonten
Midorii Purification Plant

History
Opened on August 20, 1994.

See also
Astram Line
Hiroshima Rapid Transit

Bishamondai Station